High Shoals Falls is a waterfall in Burke County, North Carolina.

Geology
The waterfall is on the Jacob's Fork River, flowing over a large rock outcropping in the South Mountains of North Carolina.  The river continues over a series of cascades for approximately 1/4 mile past the falls, where the stream loses approximately 300 ft (100 m) in elevation.

Natural history
The falls are in South Mountains State Park, which is owned and operated by the State of North Carolina.  The South Mountains, carved out of the Blue Ridge by erosion, are a broad belt of peaks and knobs rising abruptly from a deep valley. These steep, rugged mountains encompass 100,000 acres (400 km²) in Burke, Cleveland and Rutherford counties.  Water winding through the park to the Catawba River cuts deep into the terrain, forming rugged and steep slopes.  Funds to purchase the falls and park were appropriated in 1974.

Visiting the falls
The falls is located at South Mountains State Park in North Carolina.  There are many trails through the state park, and the most popular is the High Shoals Falls Loop Trail.  Visitors are encouraged to stay on the trail.  Absolutely no swimming is permitted near the falls, as deaths and injuries have occurred through the years, primarily to people who swim at the top of the falls.

Four people have died at High Shoals Falls since 1993, including a 17-year-old who fell to his death on June 14, 2011.

Nearby falls
Jacob's Fork River has several small cascades both upstream and downstream from High Shoals Falls.  Some of these are on State property.  Others are on private property.

McGalliard Falls
Catawba Falls
Upper Catawba Falls

References

External links
 High Shoals Falls at NCWaterfalls.com
 Video Overview of High Shoals Falls

Protected areas of Burke County, North Carolina
Waterfalls of North Carolina
Landforms of Burke County, North Carolina